Gaobu may refer to the following locations in China:

 Gaobu, Guangdong (高埗镇), town in Dongguan
 Gaobu, Jiangxi (高埠镇), town in Zixi County
 Gaobu, Zhejiang (皋埠镇), town in Yuecheng District, Shaoxing